Nautanwa is a constituency of the Uttar Pradesh Legislative Assembly covering the city of Nautanwa in the Maharajganj district of Uttar Pradesh, India.

Nautanwa is one of five assembly constituencies in the Maharajganj Lok Sabha constituency. Since 2008, this assembly constituency is numbered 316 amongst 403 constituencies.

Members of the Legislative Assembly

Election results

2022

2017
Independent candidate Aman Mani Tripathi won in last Assembly election of 2017 Uttar Pradesh Legislative Elections defeating Indian National Congress candidate Kunwar Kaushal Kishore Singh by a margin of 32,256 votes.

References

External links
 

Assembly constituencies of Uttar Pradesh
Maharajganj district